Football was among the sports contested at the 1940 East Asian Games, a multi-sport event organised by the Japan Association of Athletics Federations (JAAA) as part of the 2600th Anniversary Since Kigen celebrations commemorating the establishment of the Japanese Empire by Emperor Jimmu.

Results

References

East
International association football competitions hosted by Japan
1940 in Asian football